Baharestan (also Romanized as Bahārestān; also known as Kharāb and Kharrāb) is a village in Mazraeh Now Rural District, in the Central District of Ashtian County, Markazi Province, Iran. At the 2006 census, its population was 253, in 87 families.

References 

Populated places in Ashtian County